Wigston South railway station, originally named Wigston station, was a railway station serving Wigston Magna in Leicestershire. Following the arrival of the station and further substantial development of Wigston Junction, locomotive  shed and wagon works, the area was built up to form what is now known as South Wigston.

History
In 1844 the Midland Counties joined the North Midland Railway and the Birmingham and Derby Junction Railway to form the Midland Railway.

A second Wigston railway station was opened nearby on the new main line, and on 1 October 1868 the Midland Counties station was renamed Wigston South to avoid confusion.

British Railways closed the Leicester – Rugby line and its stations, including Wigston South which closed on 1 January 1962.

Stationmasters

William Foster ca. 1841
John Ison ca. 1848 ca. 1854
Thomas Parker ca 1859 ca. 1864
John Henry Blanning ca. 1871 - 1874
S. Poole 1874 - 1875 (formerly station master at Tonge and Breedon)
J. Lambert 1875 - 1876 (formerly station master at Frisby)
S. Turner 1876 - 1877 (formerly station master at Murrow (East))
W. Thorndyke 1877 - 1880 (formerly station master at Bugsworth, afterwards station master at Mountsorrel)
Edward Upstone 1880 - 1882  (formerly station master at Granville Street, Birmingham)
W.G. Stevenson 1882 - 1886 (formerly station master at Selly Oak, afterwards station master at Salford Priors)
J.H. Marston 1886 - 1891 (formerly station master at Selly Oak)
J.W. Orton 1891 - 1895 
Henry Merryweather 1895 - 1906
Arthur Harry Washbourne 1906 - 1924  (afterwards station master at Belper)
J.J. Davies until 1929 (also station master at Wigston Glen Parva, afterwards station master at Morecambe Promenade)
T. Bond until 1940 (also stationmaster at Glen Parva and Wigston Magna, afterwards station master at Barking)

Route

References

Railway stations in Great Britain opened in 1840
Railway stations in Great Britain closed in 1962
Former Midland Railway stations
Disused railway stations in Leicestershire
1840 establishments in England